is a 2016 Japanese animated science fiction action film based on the Accel World light novel series written by Reki Kawahara and illustrated by HiMA. It was produced by Sunrise, directed by Masakazu Obara and co-written by Kawahara, featuring character designs by Yukiko Aikei. It premiered in Japan on July 23, 2016. The events of the film take place after the final episode of the series.

Plot

The story starts off with a 40-minute recap of the anime television series, with Kuroyukihime narrating the recap. Then, it starts off showing a new character in what appears to be a gym. She had an accident that caused her to be hospitalized. The scene shifted off to a territory battle between Nega Nebulus and Great Wall, where Sky Raker and Ardor Maiden are fighting against two Burst Linkers. Meanwhile, Scarlet Rain and Blood Leopard are also battling off against multiple Linkers. The Scene shifted again to a battle between Silver Crow and Ash Roller. Black Lotus and Green Grandee appeared as each Legion's leaders. But before they could even battle, a huge storm appeared and destroyed the Battle Field and immediately disconnects all the Linkers from the Accelerated World. Back in the Real World, Shinomiya informs that the Brain Burst Application doesn't work as the Icon is greyed out, rendering every linker unable to Burst Link.

Characters

Voice cast

Production
Dengeki Bunko at their Autumn Festival 2015 event on October 4, 2015 announced that the light novel series will receive a new anime adaptation featuring an original story by Kawahara, titled Accel World: Infinite Burst, with the staff and cast returning from the anime television to reprise their roles in the film. In February 2016, the Dengeki Bunko Magazine announced in their 48th volume that the film is scheduled for release in Japanese theaters on July 23, 2016. The film's theme song, titled "Plasmic Fire", was performed by KOTOKO × ALTIMA.

Media

Novel
A novel titled , also written by Kawahara, was given to those who watch the film within the first week of its premiere in Japanese theaters.

Reception
The film was ninth placed at the Japanese box office on its opening weekend.

References

External links
  
 

2016 science fiction action films
2016 films
2016 anime films
Action anime and manga
Animated action films
Anime films based on light novels
Dengeki Bunko
Japanese animated science fiction films
2010s Japanese-language films
Massively multiplayer online role-playing games in fiction
Muse Communication
Sunrise (company)
Virtual reality in fiction
Viz Media anime